Lugela District is a district of Zambezia Province in Mozambique. It covers 6110 km² with 133.439 inhabitants in 2005. Its seat is the town of Lugela.

The district is inhabited mostly by the ethnic group of Manhauas and Emanhua is the most spoken language.

Geography
Lugela District borders in the north with the Namarroi District from which it is separated by the Lú River. In the south it separated from the Mocuba District by the Lugela River and Licungo River.  In the east it borders to the Ile District and in the west with Milange District.

Its highest peak is Mount Mabu that culminates to 1,700 m.

Administrative division
Administrative post of Lugela:
Lugela
Mussengane
Nagobo
Phutine
Taba
Administrative post of Muabanama:
Comone
M'Pemula
Muabanama
Administrative post of Munhamade:
Alto Lugela
Cuba
Mulide
Munhamade
Tenede
Administrative post of Tacuane:
Ebide
Mabu
Tacuane

Further reading
District profile (PDF)

 
Districts in Zambezia Province